John Horne (1848–1928) was a Scottish geologist.

John Horne is also the name of:

John Horne (botanist) (1835–1905), botanist
John Horne (footballer) (1862–1926), English soccer player
John Horne (Governor of Bombay) (died 1755)
John Horne Tooke (1736–1812), English politician, known as John Horne to 1782
John R. Horne (born c. 1939), American businessman
John E. Horne (1908–1985), American political strategist

See also

John Horn (disambiguation)